Rocinela is a genus of isopods in the family Aegidae, and was first described in 1818 by William Elford Leach. The type species is Rocinela danmoniensis Leach, 1818.

Species
Species accepted by WoRMS:
Rocinela affinis 
Rocinela americana 
Rocinela angustata 
Rocinela australis 
Rocinela belliceps 
Rocinela bonita 
Rocinela cornuta 
Rocinela cubensis 
Rocinela danmoniensis 
Rocinela dumerilii 
Rocinela garricki 
Rocinela granulosa 
Rocinela hawaiiensis 
Rocinela insularis 
Rocinela japonica 
Rocinela juvenalis 
Rocinela kapala 
Rocinela laticauda 
Rocinela leptopus 
Rocinela lukini 
Rocinela maculata 
Rocinela media 
Rocinela modesta 
Rocinela murilloi 
Rocinela niponia 
Rocinela oculata 
Rocinela ophthalmica 
Rocinela orientalis 
Rocinela pakari 
Rocinela patriciae 
Rocinela propodialis 
Rocinela resima 
Rocinela richardsonae 
Rocinela runga 
Rocinela satagia 
Rocinela signata 
Rocinela sila 
Rocinela tridens 
Rocinela tropica 
Rocinela tuberculosa 
Rocinela wetzeri

References

External links
iNaturalist: Rocinela images
GBIF: Rocinela occurrence data & images

Cymothoida
Isopod genera
Crustaceans described in 1818
Taxa named by William Elford Leach